The Dutch Chess Championship was officially established in 1909, although unofficial champions stretch back to the 1870s.

Early years
{| class="sortable wikitable"
! # !! Year !! City !! Winner
|-
| 1 || 1873 || The Hague  || Henry (H.W.B.) Gifford
|-
| 2 || 1874 || Amsterdam  || Adrianus (A.A.G.) de Lelie
|-
| 3 || 1875 || Rotterdam  || Henry (H.W.B.) Gifford
|-
| 4 || 1876 || Gouda   || Julius (J.G.C.A.) de Vogel
|-
| 5 || 1877 || The Hague  || Ansel Polak Daniels
|-
| 6 || 1878 || Amsterdam  || Maarten van 't Kruijs
|-
| 7 || 1879 || Rotterdam  || Charles (C.E.A.) Dupré
|-
| 8 || 1880 || Gouda   || Henry Edward Bird
|-
| 9 || 1881 || The Hague  || Levi Benima
|-
| 10 || 1882 || The Hague  || Christiaan Messemaker
|-
| 11 || 1883 || Rotterdam  || Levi Benima
|-
| 12 || 1884 || Gouda      || Christiaan Messemaker
|-
| 13 || 1885 || The Hague  || Dirk van Foreest
|-
| 14 || 1886 || Utrecht   || Dirk van Foreest
|-
| 15 || 1887 || Amsterdam  || Dirk van Foreest
|-
| 16 || 1888 || Rotterdam  || Rudolf Loman
|-
| 17 || 1889 || Gouda  || Arnold van Foreest
|-
| 18 || 1890 || The Hague  || Rudolf Loman
|-
| 19 || 1891 || Utrecht  || Rudolf Loman
|-
| 20 || 1892 || Amsterdam  || Robbert van den Bergh
|-
| 21 || 1893 || Groningen  || Arnold van Foreest  Rudolf Loman
|-
| 22 || 1894 || Rotterdam  || Rudolf Loman
|-
| 23 || 1895 || Arnhem     || Adolf Georg Olland
|-
| 24 || 1896 || Leiden     || Dirk Bleijkmans
|-
| 25 || 1897 || Utrecht   || Rudolf Loman
|-
| 26 || 1898 || The Hague  || Jan Diderik Tresling
|-
| 27 || 1899 || Amsterdam  || Henry Ernest Atkins
|-
| 28 || 1900 || Groningen  || Gerard Oskam
|-
| 29 || 1901 || Haarlem    || Adolf Georg Olland
|-
| 30 || 1902 || Rotterdam  || Arnold van Foreest
|-
| 31 || 1903 || Hilversum  || Paul Saladin Leonhardt
|-
| 32 || 1904 || Leeuwarden || Dirk Bleijkmans
|-
| 33 || 1905 || Scheveningen || Frank James Marshall
|-
| 34 || 1906 || Arnhem   || Bernard Wolff Beffie
|-
| 35 || 1907 || Utrecht    || Jan Willem te Kolsté
|-
| 36 || 1908 || Haarlem    || Jan F. Esser 
|}

Official championships
The official championship was established in 1909 as a biennial, twelve-player, round-robin tournament.
As of 1970, the top five finishers were seeded into the next championship, one player was nominated by the Selection Committee and six came from preliminary qualifying tournaments.  Three regional qualifying tournaments of eight to twelve players each were held over four weekends.  Grandmasters were not required to qualify to play in the championship.  In 1970, annual championships were instituted. In 1935 a championship for women was established.

{| class="sortable wikitable"
! Year !! City (men) !! Winner !! Women's winner
|-
| 1909 || Leiden     || Adolf Georg Olland
|-
| 1912 || Delft      || Rudolf Loman
|-
| 1913 || Amsterdam  || Johannes Esser
|-
| 1919 || The Hague  || Max Marchand
|-
| 1921 || Nijmegen   || Max Euwe
|-
| 1924 || Amsterdam  || Max Euwe
|-
| 1926 || Utrecht    || Max Euwe
|-
| 1929 || Amsterdam  || Max Euwe
|-
| 1933 || The Hague  || Max Euwe 
|-
| 1935 ||                ||                 || Catharina Roodzant
|-
| 1936 || Rotterdam  || Salo Landau || Catharina Roodzant
|-
| 1937 ||                ||                 || Fenny Heemskerk
|-
| 1938 || Amsterdam  || Max Euwe    || Catharina Roodzant
|-
| 1939 || matchEuwe - Landau   || Max Euwe    || Fenny Heemskerk
|-
| 1942 || matchEuwe - van den Hoek   || Max Euwe
|-
| 1946 ||                ||                 || Fenny Heemskerk
|-
| 1947 || match          || Max Euwe
|-
| 1948 || matchEuwe - van Scheltinga   || Max Euwe    || Fenny Heemskerk
|-
| 1950 || Amsterdam  || Max Euwe    || Fenny Heemskerk
|-
| 1952 || Enschede   || Max Euwe    || Fenny Heemskerk
|-
| 1954 || Amsterdam  || Jan Hein Donner || Fenny Heemskerk
|-
| 1955 || 1954 match     || Max Euwe
|-
| 1956 ||                ||                     || Fenny Heemskerk
|-
| 1957 || Amsterdam  || Jan Hein Donner
|-
| 1958 || Amsterdam  || Jan Hein Donner  || Fenny Heemskerk
|-
| 1960 ||                ||                    || Corry Vreeken
|-
| 1961 || The Hague  || Hiong Liong Tan || Fenny Heemskerk
|-
| 1962 ||                ||                    || Corry Vreeken
|-
| 1963 || The Hague  || Franciscus Kuijpers
|-
| 1964 ||                ||                    || Corry Vreeken
|-
| 1965 || The Hague  || Lodewijk Prins
|-
| 1966 ||                ||                    || Corry Vreeken
|-
| 1967 || Zierikzee  || Hans Ree
|-
| 1968 ||                ||                    || Ingrid Tuk
|-
| 1969 || Leeuwarden || Hans Ree
|-
| 1970 || Leeuwarden || Eddy Scholl|| Corry Vreeken
|-
| 1971 || Leeuwarden || Hans Ree || Rie Timmer
|-
| 1972 || Leeuwarden || Coen Zuidema || Rie Timmer
|-
| 1973 || Leeuwarden || Genna Sosonko || Ada van der Giessen
|-
| 1974 || Leeuwarden || Jan Timman || Cathy van der Mije
|-
| 1975 || Leeuwarden || Jan Timman || Erika Belle
|-
| 1976 || Leeuwarden || Jan Timman || Cathy van der Mije
|-
| 1977 || Leeuwarden || Viktor Korchnoi || Cathy van der Mije
|-
| 1978 || Leeuwarden || Jan Timman  Genna Sosonko || Cathy van der Mije
|-
| 1979 || Leeuwarden || Gert Ligterink || Cathy van der Mije
|-
| 1980 || Leeuwarden || Jan Timman || Erika Belle
|-
| 1981 || Leeuwarden || Jan Timman || Erika Belle
|-
| 1982 || Amsterdam  || Hans Ree || Carla Bruinenberg
|-
| 1983 || Hilversum  || Jan Timman || Carla Bruinenberg
|-
| 1984 || Hilversum  || John van der Wiel || Carla Bruinenberg  Heleen de Greef
|-
| 1985 || Hilversum  || Paul van der Sterren || Jessica Harmsen  Hanneke van Parreren
|-
| 1986 || Hilversum || John van der Wiel || Heleen de Greef
|-
| 1987 || Hilversum || Jan Timman || Jessica Harmsen
|-
| 1988 || Hilversum || Rudy Douven || Jessica Harmsen
|-
| 1989 || Hilversum || Marinus Kuijf || Mariette Drewes
|-
| 1990 || Hilversum || Jeroen Piket || Renate Limbach
|- 
| 1991 || Eindhoven || Jeroen Piket || Anne Marie Benschop
|-
| 1992 || Eindhoven || Jeroen Piket || Erika Sziva
|-
| 1993 || Eindhoven || Paul van der Sterren || Iwona Bos-Swiecik
|-
| 1994 || Amsterdam || Jeroen Piket || Erika Sziva
|-
| 1995 || Amsterdam || Ivan Sokolov || Marisca Kouwenhoven
|-
| 1996 || Amsterdam || Jan Timman || Erika Sziva
|-
| 1997 || Rotterdam || Predrag Nikolić || Peng Zhaoqin
|-
| 1998 || Rotterdam || Ivan Sokolov || Erika Sziva
|-
| 1999 || Rotterdam || Predrag Nikolić || Erika Sziva
|-
| 2000 || Rotterdam || Loek van Wely || Peng Zhaoqin
|-
| 2001 || Leeuwarden || Loek van Wely || Peng Zhaoqin
|-
| 2002 || Leeuwarden || Loek van Wely || Peng Zhaoqin
|-
| 2003 || Leeuwarden || Loek van Wely || Peng Zhaoqin
|-
| 2004 || Leeuwarden || Loek van Wely || Peng Zhaoqin
|-
| 2005 || Leeuwarden || Loek van Wely || Peng Zhaoqin
|-
| 2006 || Hilversum || Sergei Tiviakov || Peng Zhaoqin
|-
| 2007 || Hilversum || Sergei Tiviakov || Peng Zhaoqin
|-
| 2008 || Hilversum ||  || Peng Zhaoqin
|-
| 2009 || Haaksbergen ||  || Peng Zhaoqin 
|-
| 2010 || Eindhoven ||  || Peng Zhaoqin 
|-
| 2011 || Boxtel ||  || Peng Zhaoqin 
|-
| 2012 || Amsterdam ||  || Tea Lanchava
|-
| 2013 || Amsterdam || Dimitri Reinderman || Lisa Schut
|-
| 2014 || Amsterdam || Loek van Wely || Anne Haast
|-
| 2015 || Amsterdam ||  || Anne Haast
|-
| 2016 || Amsterdam ||  || Anne Haast
|-
| 2017 || Amsterdam || Loek van Wely || Anne Haast
|-
| 2018 || Amsterdam || Sergei Tiviakov || Peng Zhaoqin
|-
| 2019 || Amsterdam ||   || Iozefina Păuleţ
|-
| 2021 || Hoogeveen/Rotterdam ||   || Anne Haast
|-
|2022
|Dieren
|Erwin L'Ami
|Machteld van Foreest
|}

Notes

References
 (some player's full names)

 (results from 1873 through 1985)

External links
 Dutch Chess Champions
 Historical ratings
 

Chess national championships
Women's chess national championships
Championship
National championships in the Netherlands